Scheherazade New, formerly Scheherazade, is a traditional Naskh styled font for Arabic script created by SIL, freely available under the Open Font License. It supports a wide range of Arabic-based writing system encoded in Unicode. The font offers two family members: regular and bold.

Scheherazade New supports Graphite and OpenType technologies for contextual shaping, ligatures, and dynamic diacritics positioning, also provides advanced rendering features including localized forms, character variants. It is licensed under the SIL Open Font License (OFL), and can be downloaded free of charge.

Demonstration 

Notice that the earlier version looks smaller, but nevertheless has a more complete coverage of some rare characters and only one character failed to render properly. SF Arabic is here to demonstrate how the letters are supposed to look like; available to Apple users and has a complete Arabic coverage.

For this demonstration to succeed, you need to install both fonts or import them from the web. Scheherazade is already a Wikimedia font, while Scheherazade New is available on Google Fonts.

See also 
 Naskh script

References

External links
Scheherazade New homepage

Arabic typefaces
Free software Unicode typefaces